Surendra Singh Negi is an Uttarakhand politician. He is a former MLA of the Uttarakhand Legislative Assembly from Kotdwar. He is a member of the Indian National Congress. He was a minister in the Cabinets of N. D. Tiwari, Vijay Bahuguna and Harish Rawat. In 2012 Assembly election, he defeated B. C. Khanduri by 4,623 votes. He has close political relations with powerful politicians Shri Chandra Mohan Singh Negi and Girdhari Lal Amoli.

Positions held

Legislative career

Elections contested

References

External links
 2017 Assembly Election
 2012 Assembly Election
 2007 Assembly Election

Living people
20th-century Indian politicians
Indian National Congress politicians from Uttarakhand
Uttarakhand politicians
Year of birth missing (living people)